Old House Museum may refer to:

Old House Museum, Bakewell, Derbyshire, England
Old Stone House Museum, USA
Oldest House Museum in St. Augustine, Florida, USA
Oldest House Museum in Key West, Florida; operated by the Old Island Restoration Foundation , USA